The 1995 Caribbean Cup (known as the Shell Caribbean Cup for sponsorship reasons) was the seventh edition of the Caribbean Cup, the football championship of the Caribbean, one of the CONCACAF zones. The final stage was hosted by Jamaica and Cayman Islands.

Preliminary qualifying round

Netherlands Antilles advances with a 7–5 aggregate score.

Qualifying round

Qualifying Group 1 (in Dominican Republic)

Qualifying Group 2 (in French Guiana)

Qualifying Group 3

First round

Second round

Qualifying Group 4

First round

Second round

Qualifying Group 5

First round

Second round

Final tournament

First round

Group A

Group B

Semi-finals

3rd place match

Final

Top scorers

Caribbean Cup
Caribbean Cup
International sports competitions hosted by the Cayman Islands
Caribbean Cup, 1995
International association football competitions hosted by Jamaica
Caribbean Cup